Acrolophus perrensella is a moth of the family Acrolophidae. It is found in Argentina.

References

Moths described in 1887
perrensella